An elephant trunk or elephant's trunk is the proboscis/nose of an elephant.

The phrase may also refer to:

 Elephant trunk (astronomy), a type of formation of interstellar matter
 Elephant's Trunk Nebula, a specific nebula
 Elephant Trunk Hill, a landmark and tourist attraction in Guilin, Guangxi, China
 Funnel cloud
 Elephant trunk snake, a species of snake

See also
 Elephant's toothpaste, a foam produced by the chemical decomposition of hydrogen peroxide; a popular children's science experiment